Events from the year 1735 in Great Britain.

Incumbents
 Monarch – George II
 Regent – Caroline, Queen Consort (starting 17 May, until 26 October)
 Prime Minister – Robert Walpole (Whig)
 Parliament – 8th

Events
 2 January – Alexander Pope's poem Epistle to Dr Arbuthnot is published in London.
 8 January – premiere of George Frideric Handel's opera Ariodante at the Royal Opera House, Covent Garden in London.
 16 April – London premiere of Alcina by Handel, his first Italian opera for the Royal Opera House.
 20 April – religious conversion of Howell Harris at Talgarth church, marking a beginning of the Welsh Methodist revival.
 10 May – Charles Macklin unintentionally kills fellow actor Thomas Hallam after a dispute during a performance at the Theatre Royal, Drury Lane in London. He is later tried and convicted of manslaughter.
 22 May – George Hadley publishes the first explanation of the trade winds.
 24 June – Witchcraft Act 1735 comes into effect, introducing penalties for pretending to practice witchcraft and repealing those against its supposed actual practice.
 22 September – Robert Walpole moves into 10 Downing Street.
 6 December – the second successful appendectomy is performed by naturalised French-born surgeon Claudius Aymand at St George's Hospital in London (the first was in 1731).

Undated
 William Hogarth produces his A Rake's Progress series of paintings.
 Unscrupulous London publisher Edmund Curll produces Letters of Mr. Pope, and Several Eminent Persons containing forgeries.
 Richard Leveridge writes a melody to Henry Fielding's The Roast Beef of Old England.
 Beau Nash appoints himself master of ceremonies at Tunbridge Wells.

Births
 8 January – John Jervis, 1st Earl of St Vincent, Royal Navy admiral (died 1823)
 22 February – Charles Lennox, 3rd Duke of Richmond, politician (died 1806)
 25 February (bapt.) – William Speechly, horticulturalist (died 1819)
 10 April (bapt.) – Button Gwinnett, 2nd Governor of Georgia (died 1777)
 8 May – Nathaniel Dance, portrait painter and politician (died 1811)
 7 September – Thomas Coutts, banker (died 1822)
 20 September – James Keir, Scottish-born geologist, chemist and industrialist (died 1820)
 28 September – Augustus FitzRoy, 3rd Duke of Grafton, Prime Minister (died 1811)
 21 October – Richard Gough, antiquary (died 1809)
 10 November – Granville Sharp, abolitionist (died 1813)
 14 November – John Howie, Scottish biographer (died 1793)
 29 December – Thomas Banks, sculptor and artist (died 1805)

Undated
 John Barrow, Catholic priest (died 1811)

Deaths
 12 January – John Eccles, composer (born 1668)
 27 February – John Arbuthnot, physician and author (born 1667)
 29 March – Emanuel Howe, 2nd Viscount Howe, politician and colonial administrator (born 1700)
 5 April – William Derham, minister and writer (born 1657)
 25 April – Samuel Wesley, poet and religious leader (born 1662)
 10 June – Thomas Hearne, antiquarian (born 1678)
 14 December – Thomas Tanner, bishop and antiquarian (born 1674)

References

 
Years in Great Britain